The following is a list of notable stand-up comedians by nationality.

Argentina

Australia

Austria

Bangladesh 
 Naveed Mahbub

Belgium

Brazil

Canada

Colombia 
 Andrés López

Cuba

Denmark

Finland

France

Germany

Hong Kong

Hungary 
Sándor Fábry
Géza Hofi

Iceland 
Jón Gnarr

India

Indonesia

Ireland

Israel 
 Adir Miller
 Naor Zion

Italy

Malawi 
 Daliso Chaponda

Malaysia 
 Harith Iskander
 Kavin Jayaram
 Patrick Teoh

Mexico

Middle East 
The first country listed is that of origin; the second is that in which the comedian achieved notability or most commonly performs.

Netherlands

New Zealand

Nigeria

Norway

Pakistan

Philippines

Portugal

Romania

Russia

Saint Vincent and the Grenadines 

 Saluche

Singapore
 Umar Rana

Slovenia
 Tin Vodopivec

South Africa

Spain

Sweden

Turkey

United Kingdom

United States

Venezuela

See also 
List of comedians
List of deadpan comedians

References

Stand up